The following is a list of hoverfly (Syrphidae) species recorded in Great Britain.

Alan Stubbs and Steven Falk, in their 1983 work British Hoverflies, divided the family into subfamilies and tribes. These subdivisions are now believed to be, to some extent, artificial groupings, not reflecting the evolutionary relationships within the family, so in need of revision. As no replacement system is yet in place, though, these groupings are retained in this list.

The six unnamed species listed in Stubbs and Falk (1983) are not included below.

Subfamily Syrphinae

Tribe Bacchini (incorporating Melanostomatini)

Baccha
 Baccha elongata  (syn. B. obscuripennis)
Melanostoma
 Melanostoma dubium
 Melanostoma mellinum
 Melanostoma scalare
Platycheirus
Subgenus Pachysphyria
 Platycheirus ambiguus
Subgenus Platycheirus
 Platycheirus albimanus
Platycheirus amplus
 Platycheirus angustatus
 Platycheirus aurolateralis
 Platycheirus clypeatus
 Platycheirus discimanus
 Platycheirus europaeus
 Platycheirus fulviventris
 Platycheirus immarginatus
 Platycheirus manicatus
 Platycheirus melanopsis
 Platycheirus nielseni
 Platycheirus occultus
 Platycheirus peltatus
 Platycheirus perpallidus
 Platycheirus podagratus
 Platycheirus ramsaerensis
 Platycheirus scambus
 Platycheirus scutatus
 Platycheirus splendidus
 Platycheirus sticticus
 Platycheirus tarsalis
Subgenus Pyrophaena
 Platycheirus granditarsus
 Platycheirus rosarum
Xanthandrus
 Xanthandrus comtus

Tribe Paragini

Paragus
Subgenus Pandasyopthalmus
Paragus constrictus
Paragus haemorrhous
Paragus tibialis
Subgenus Paragus
 Paragus albifrons

Tribe Syrphini (incorporating Chrysotoxini)

Chrysotoxum
Chrysotoxum arcuatum
Chrysotoxum bicinctum
Chrysotoxum cautum
Chrysotoxum elegans
Chrysotoxum festivum
Chrysotoxum octomaculatum
Chrysotoxum vernale
Chrysotoxum verralli
Dasysyrphus
Dasysyrphus albostriatus
Dasysyrphus friuliensis
Dasysyrphus hilaris 
Dasysyrphus pauxillus
Dasysyrphus pinastri
Dasysyrphus tricinctus
Dasysyrphus venustus
Didea
Didea alneti
Didea fasciata
Didea intermedia
Doros
 Doros profuges
Epistrophe
Subgenus Epistrophe
Epistrophe diaphana
Epistrophe eligans
Epistrophe grossulariae
Epistrophe melanostoma
Epistrophe nitidicollis
Epistrophe ochrostoma
Epistrophella
Epistrophella euchromus
Episyrphus
Episyrphus balteatus
Eriozona
Subgenus Eriozona
Eriozona syrphoides
Eupeodes
Subgenus Eupeodes
Eupeodes corollae
Eupeodes latifasciatus
Eupeodes latilunulatus (bucculatus)
Eupeodes lundbecki
Eupeodes luniger
Eupeodes nielseni
Eupeodes nitens
Fagisyrphus
Fagisyrphus cinctus
Lapposyrphus
Lapposyrphus lapponicus
Leucozona
Subgenus Ischyrosyrphus
Leucozona glaucia
Leucozona laternaria
Subgenus Leucozona
Leucozona lucorum
Megasyrphus
Megasyrphus erraticus (syn. Megasyrphus annulipes)
Melangyna
Melangyna arctica
Melangyna barbifrons
Melangyna compositarum
Melangyna ericarum
Melangyna labiatarum
Melangyna lasiophthalma
Melangyna quadrimaculata
Melangyna umbellatarum
Meligramma
Meligramma guttatum
Meligramma triangulifera
Meliscaeva
Meliscaeva auricollis
Meliscaeva cinctella
Parasyrphus
Parasyrphus annulatus
Parasyrphus lineolus
Parasyrphus malinellus
Parasyrphus nigritarsis
Parasyrphus punctulatus
Parasyrphus vittiger
Philhelius
Philhelius citrofasciatus
Philhelius pedissequus
Philhelius stackelbergi
Scaeva
Scaeva albomaculata
Scaeva dignota
Scaeva mecogramma
Scaeva pyrastri
Scaeva selenitica
Sphaerophoria
Sphaerophoria bankowskae
Sphaerophoria batava
Sphaerophoria fatarum
Sphaerophoria interrupta
Sphaerophoria loewi
Sphaerophoria philanthus
Sphaerophoria potentillae 
Sphaerophoria rueppellii
Sphaerophoria scripta
Sphaerophoria taeniata
Sphaerophoria virgata 
Syrphus
Syrphus ribesii
Syrphus torvus
Syrphus vitripennis

Subfamily Milesiinae

Tribe Callicerini

Callicera
Callicera aurata
Callicera rufa
Callicera spinolae

Tribe Cheilosiini

Cheilosia
Cheilosia ahenea
Cheilosia albipila
Cheilosia albitarsis
Cheilosia antiqua
Cheilosia barbata
Cheilosia bergenstammi
Cheilosia caerulescens
Cheilosia carbonaria
Cheilosia chrysocoma
Cheilosia cynocephala
Cheilosia fraterna
Cheilosia griseiventris
Cheilosia grossa
Cheilosia illustrata
Cheilosia impressa
Cheilosia lasiopa
Cheilosia latifrons (syn. C. intonsa)
Cheilosia longula
Cheilosia mutabilis
Cheilosia nebulosa
Cheilosia nigripes
Cheilosia pagana
Cheilosia praecox (syn. C. globulipes)
Cheilosia proxima
Cheilosia psilophthalma
Cheilosia pubera
Cheilosia sahlbergi
Cheilosia scutellata
Cheilosia semifasciata
Cheilosia soror
Cheilosia uviformis
Cheilosia variabilis
Cheilosia velutina
Cheilosia vernalis
Cheilosia vicina (syn. C. nasutula)
Cheilosia vulpina
Ferdinandea
Ferdinandea cuprea
Ferdinandea ruficornis
Portevinia
Portevinia maculata
Rhingia
Rhingia campestris
Rhingia rostrata

Tribe Chrysogastrini

Brachyopa
Brachyopa bicolor
Brachyopa insensilis
Brachyopa pilosa
Brachyopa scutellaris
Chrysogaster
Chrysogaster cemiteriorum (syn. Ch. chalybeata)
Chrysogaster solstitialis
Chrysogaster virescens

Hammerschmidtia
Hammerschmidtia ferruginea 
Lejogaster
Subgenus Liogaster
Lejogaster metallina
Lejogaster tarsata (syn. L. splendida)
Melanogaster
Melanogaster aerosa
Melanogaster hirtella
Myolepta
Myolepta dubia
Myolepta potens
Neoascia
Subgenus Neoascia
Neoascia podagrica
Neoascia tenur
Subgenus Neoasciella
Neoascia geniculata
Neoascia interrupta
Neoascia meticulosa
Neoascia obliqua
Orthonevra
Orthonevra brevicornis
Orthonevra geniculata
Orthonevra intermedia
Orthonevra nobilis
Riponnensia
Riponnensia splendens
Sphegina
Subgenus Asiosphegina
Sphegina sibirica
Subgenus Sphegina
Sphegina clunipes
Sphegina elegans (syn. Sphegina kimakowiczi)
Sphegina verecunda

Tribe Eristalini

Anasimyia
Anasimyia contracta
Anasimyia interpuncta
Anasimyia lineata
Anasimyia lunulata
Anasimyia transfuga
Eristalinus
Subgenus Eristalinus
Eristalinus sepulchralis
Subgenus Lathyrophthalmus
Eristalinus aeneus
Eristalis
Subgenus Eoseristalis
 Eristalis abusiva
 Eristalis arbustorum
 Eristalis cryptarum
 Eristalis horticola
 Eristalis interruptus
 Eristalis intricarius
 Eristalis pertinax
 Eristalis rupium
 Eristalis similis
Subgenus Eristalis
 Eristalis tenax
Helophilus
Helophilus affinis
Helophilus groenlandicus
Helophilus hybridus
Helophilus pendulus
Helophilus trivittatus
Lejops
Lejops vittatus
Mallota
Mallota cimbiciformis
Myathropa
Myathropa florea
Parhelophilus
Parhelophilus consimilis
Parhelophilus frutetorum
Parhelophilus versicolor

Tribe Merodontini (incorporating Eumerini)

Eumerus
Eumerus funeralis 
Eumerus ornatus
Eumerus sabulonum
Eumerus sogdianus
Eumerus strigatus
Merodon
Merodon equestris
Platynochaetus
Platynochaetus setosus (accidental import on vegetables)
Psilota
Psilota anthracina

Tribe Pelecocerini

Chamaesyrphus
Chamaesyrphus caledonicus
Chamaesyrphus scaevoides
Pelecocera
Pelecocera tricincta

Tribe Pipizini

Heringia
Subgenus Heringia
Heringia heringi
Subgenus Neocnemodon
Heringia brevidens
Heringia latitarsis
Heringia pubescens
Heringia verrucula
Heringia vitripennis
Pipiza
Pipiza austriaca
Pipiza bimaculata
Pipiza fenestrata
Pipiza lugubris
Pipiza luteitarsis
Pipiza noctiluca
Pipizella
Pipizella maculipennis
Pipizella virens
Trichopsomyia
Trichopsomyia flavitarsis
Triglyphus
Triglyphus primus

Tribe Sericomyiini

Arctophila
Arctophila superbiens (syn. A. fulva)
Sericomyia
Sericomyia lappona
Sericomyia silentis

Tribe Volucellini

Volucella
Volucella bombylans
Volucella inanis
Volucella inflata
Volucella pellucens
Volucella zonaria

Tribe Xylotini

Blera
Blera fallax
Brachypalpoides
Brachypalpoides lentus
Brachypalpus
Brachypalpus laphriformis 
Caliprobola
Caliprobola speciosa
Chalcosyrphus
Subgenus Xylotina
Chalcosyrphus nemorum
Subgenus Xylotodes
Chalcosyrphus eunotus
Subgenus Xylotomima
Chalcosyrphus piger
Criorhina
Criorhina asilica
Criorhina berberina
Criorhina floccosa
Criorhina ranunculi
Pocota
Pocota personata
Syritta
Syritta pipiens
Tropidia
Tropidia scita
Xylota
Xylota abiens
Xylota coeruleiventris
Xylota florum
Xylota jakutorum
Xylota segnis
Xylota sylvarum
Xylota tarda
Xylota xanthocnema

Subfamily Microdontinae

Microdon
Microdon analis (syn. M. eggeri)
Microdon devius
Microdon mutabilis
Microdon myrmicae

Notes

References

Bibliography

Hoverflies, Britain
Hoverflies, Britain
List, Britain
Hoverfly
Diptera of Europe
Hoverfly species